Aswanto is an Indonesian Justice of the Constitutional Court of Indonesia, served until November 2022. He then replaced by Guntur Hamzah. He and Wahiduddin Adams were appointed by the People's Representative Council in March 2014. Aswanto graduated from Hasanuddin University, where he was serving on the Faculty of Law at the time of his appointment to the Constitutional Court, and also earned a Master's of Law from Gadjah Mada University and a doctorate in law from Airlangga University. Prior to his appointment to the court, he was active in judicial and electoral affairs of South Sulawesi, having served on the province's Justice and Human Rights Regional Office, General Election Supervisory Committee and as the ombudsmen of Makassar.

Aswanto was one of several judges who ruled in favor of outlawing premarital sex and criminalizing consensual same-sex acts. Aswanto also joined the rest of the Constitutional Court in opposition to total privatization of Indonesia's water resources, and in viewing challenges to Indonesia's tax amnesty law with suspicion. Aswanto also ruled against Omnibus Law concerning job creation.

References

Justices of the Constitutional Court of Indonesia
21st-century Indonesian judges
Living people
Gadjah Mada University alumni
People from Palopo
1964 births